Origin of the Uzunyayla breed dates to 1854 in Turkey. Ancestors of the breed came from the Caucasus, and it is believed that they were of the Kabarda (horse) breed. They were bred pure in Turkey until 1930, when Anadolu pony and Nonius (horse) blood was introduced.

The Uzunyayla has a large head with a concave profile; the eyes are small; the neck is of medium length; the withers are well pronounced; the legs are strong with good joints; the pasterns are sloped and very strong; the feet are well shaped and of tough horn. The Uzunyayla is usually bay in colour. Feathering on the legs is coarse, and the tail grows very long.

This breed is very good for riding long distances. Uzunyayla horses have a good gallop but cannot do the rahvan walk like some other Turkish breeds. The normal walking speed is not fast as is seen in the Anadolu breed. They are used as a pack horse, a light draft horse and as a general riding horse.

There is no association or stud book for the Uzunyayla breed, but breeders hope that one will be formed in the near future. Presently there are only about 2,000 specimens of this breed.

References
 Breeds and their Legal/Common colors
 Hendricks, Bonnie.  International Encyclopedia of Horse Breeds page 430

Horse breeds
Horse breeds originating in Turkey